The Miocene is the first geological epoch of the Neogene Period and extends from about  (Ma). The Miocene is preceded by the Oligocene and is followed by the Pliocene.

As Earth went from the Oligocene through the Miocene and into the Pliocene, the climate slowly cooled towards a series of ice ages. The Miocene boundaries are not marked by a single distinct global event but consist rather of regionally defined boundaries between the warmer Oligocene and the cooler Pliocene Epoch.

During the Early Miocene, the Arabian Peninsula collided with Eurasia, severing the connection between the Mediterranean and Indian Ocean, and allowing a faunal interchange to occur between Eurasia and Africa, including the dispersal of proboscideans into Eurasia. During the late Miocene, the connections between the Atlantic and Mediterranean closed, causing the Mediterranean Sea to nearly completely evaporate, in an event called the Messinian salinity crisis. The Strait of Gibraltar opened and the Mediterranean refilled at the Miocene–Pliocene boundary, in an event called the Zanclean flood.

The apes first evolved, arose, and diversified during the early Miocene (Aquitanian and Burdigalian Stages), becoming widespread in the Old World. By the end of this epoch and the start of the following one, the ancestors of humans had split away from the ancestors of the chimpanzees to follow their own evolutionary path during the final Messinian Stage (7.5–5.3 Ma) of the Miocene. As in the Oligocene before it, grasslands continued to expand and forests to dwindle in extent. In the seas of the Miocene, kelp forests made their first appearance and soon became one of Earth's most productive ecosystems.

The plants and animals of the Miocene were recognizably modern. Mammals and birds were well-established. Whales, pinnipeds, and kelp spread.

The Miocene is of particular interest to geologists and palaeoclimatologists as major phases of the geology of the Himalaya occurred during the Miocene, affecting monsoonal patterns in Asia, which were interlinked with glacial periods in the northern hemisphere.

Subdivisions

The Miocene faunal stages from youngest to oldest are typically named according to the International Commission on Stratigraphy:

Regionally, other systems are used, based on characteristic land mammals; some of them overlap with the preceding Oligocene and following Pliocene Epochs:

European Land Mammal Ages
 Turolian (9.0 to 5.3 Ma)
 Vallesian (11.6 to 9.0 Ma)
 Astaracian (16.0 to 11.6 Ma)
 Orleanian (20.0 to 16.0 Ma)
 Agenian (23.8 to 20.0 Ma)

North American Land Mammal Ages
 Hemphillian (10.3 to 4.9 Ma)
 Clarendonian (13.6 to 10.3 Ma)
 Barstovian (16.3 to 13.6 Ma)
 Hemingfordian (20.6 to 16.3 Ma)
 Arikareean (30.6 to 20.6 Ma)

South American Land Mammal Ages
 Montehermosan (6.8 to 4.0 Ma)
 Huayquerian (9.0 to 6.8 Ma)
 Mayoan (11.8 to 9.0 Ma)
 Laventan (13.8 to 11.8 Ma)
 Colloncuran (15.5 to 13.8 Ma)
 Friasian (16.3 to 15.5 Ma)
 Santacrucian (17.5 to 16.3 Ma)
 Colhuehuapian (21.0 to 17.5 Ma)

Paleogeography

Continents continued to drift toward their present positions. Of the modern geologic features, only the land bridge between South America and North America was absent, although South America was approaching the western subduction zone in the Pacific Ocean, causing both the rise of the Andes and a southward extension of the Meso-American peninsula.

Mountain building took place in western North America, Europe, and East Asia. Both continental and marine Miocene deposits are common worldwide with marine outcrops common near modern shorelines. Well studied continental exposures occur in the North American Great Plains and in Argentina.

The global trend was towards increasing aridity caused primarily by global cooling reducing the ability of the atmosphere to absorb moisture, particularly after 7 to 8 million years ago. Uplift of East Africa in the late Miocene was partly responsible for the shrinking of tropical rain forests in that region, and Australia got drier as it entered a zone of low rainfall in the Late Miocene.

Eurasia 
India continued to collide with Asia, creating dramatic new mountain ranges as well as uplifting the Tibetan Plateau, which resulted in the aridification of the Asian interior. 

At the beginning of the Miocene, the northern margin of the Arabian plate, then part of the African landmass, collided with Eurasia; as a result, the Tethys seaway continued to shrink and then disappeared as Africa collided with Eurasia in the Turkish–Arabian region. The first step of this closure occurred 20 Ma, reducing water mass exchange by 90%, while the second step occurred around 13.8 Ma, coincident with a major expansion of Antarctic glaciers. This severed the connection between the Indian Ocean and the Mediterranean Sea and formed the present land connection between Afro-Arabia and Eurasia. The subsequent uplift of mountains in the western Mediterranean region and a global fall in sea levels combined to cause a temporary drying up of the Mediterranean Sea (known as the Messinian salinity crisis) near the end of the Miocene.

The Paratethys underwent a significant transgression during the early Middle Miocene. Around 13.8 Ma, during a global sea level drop, the Eastern Paratethys was cut off from the global ocean by the closure of the Bârlad Strait, effectively turning it into a saltwater lake. From 13.8 to 13.36 Ma, an evaporite period similar to the later Messinian Salinity Crisis in the Mediterranean ensued in the Central Paratethys, cut off from sources of freshwater input by its separation from the Eastern Paratethys. From 13.36 to 12.65 Ma, the Central Paratethys was characterised by open marine conditions, before the reopening of the Bârlad Strait resulted in a shift to brackish-marine conditions in the Central Paratethys, causing the Badenian-Sarmatian Extinction Event. As a result of the Bârlad Strait's reopening, the lake levels of the Eastern Paratethys dropped as it once again became a sea.

South America
During the Oligocene and Early Miocene, the coast of northern Brazil, Colombia, south-central Peru, central Chile and large swathes of inland Patagonia were subject to a marine transgression. The transgressions in the west coast of South America are thought to be caused by a regional phenomenon while the steadily rising central segment of the Andes represents an exception. While there are numerous registers of Oligo-Miocene transgressions around the world it is doubtful that these correlate.

It is thought that the Oligo-Miocene transgression in Patagonia could have temporarily linked the Pacific and Atlantic Oceans, as inferred from the findings of marine invertebrate fossils of both Atlantic and Pacific affinity in La Cascada Formation. Connection would have occurred through narrow epicontinental seaways that formed channels in a dissected topography.

The Antarctic Plate started to subduct beneath South America 14 million years ago in the Miocene, forming the Chile Triple Junction. At first the Antarctic Plate subducted only in the southernmost tip of Patagonia, meaning that the Chile Triple Junction lay near the Strait of Magellan. As the southern part of Nazca Plate and the Chile Rise became consumed by subduction the more northerly regions of the Antarctic Plate begun to subduct beneath Patagonia so that the Chile Triple Junction advanced to the north over time. The asthenospheric window associated to the triple junction disturbed previous patterns of mantle convection beneath Patagonia inducing an uplift of ca. 1 km that reversed the Oligocene–Miocene transgression.

As the southern Andes rose in the Middle Miocene (14–12 million years ago) the resulting rain shadow originated the Patagonian Desert to the east.

Climate
Climates remained moderately warm, although the slow global cooling that eventually led to the Pleistocene glaciations continued. Although a long-term cooling trend was well underway, there is evidence of a warm period during the Miocene when the global climate rivalled that of the Oligocene. The climate of the Miocene has been suggested as a good analogue for future warmer climates caused by anthropogenic global warming, with this being especially true of the global climate during the Middle Miocene Climatic Optimum.

The Miocene began with the Early Miocene Cool Event around 23 million years ago. The Miocene warming began 21 million years ago and continued until 14 million years ago, when global temperatures took a sharp drop—the Middle Miocene Climate Transition (MMCT). Greenland may have begun to have large glaciers as early as 7 to 8 million years ago, although the climate for the most part remained warm enough to support forests there well into the Pliocene. Between 7 and 5.3 million years ago, temperatures dropped sharply once again in what is now known as the Late Miocene Cooling (LMC), most likely as a result of a decline in atmospheric carbon dioxide and a drop in the amplitude of Earth's obliquity, and the Antarctic ice sheet was already approaching its present-day size and thickness. Ocean temperatures plummeted to near-modern values during the LMC. A major reorganisation of the carbon cycle occurred approximately 6 Ma, causing equatorial carbon reservoirs to no longer expand during cold spells, as they had done during cold periods in the Oligocene and most of the Miocene. At the terminus of the Miocene, global temperatures rose once again as the amplitude of Earth's obliquity increased.

Life
Life during the Miocene Epoch was mostly supported by the two newly formed biomes, kelp forests and grasslands. Grasslands allow for more grazers, such as horses, rhinoceroses, and hippos. Ninety-five percent of modern plants existed by the end of this epoch. Modern bony fish genera were established.

Flora

The coevolution of gritty, fibrous, fire-tolerant grasses and long-legged gregarious ungulates with high-crowned teeth, led to a major expansion of grass-grazer ecosystems, with roaming herds of large, swift grazers pursued by predators across broad sweeps of open grasslands, displacing desert, woodland, and browsers.

The higher organic content and water retention of the deeper and richer grassland soils, with long-term burial of carbon in sediments, produced a carbon and water vapor sink. This, combined with higher surface albedo and lower evapotranspiration of grassland, contributed to a cooler, drier climate. C4 grasses, which are able to assimilate carbon dioxide and water more efficiently than C3 grasses, expanded to become ecologically significant near the end of the Miocene between 6 and 7 million years ago. The expansion of grasslands and radiations among terrestrial herbivores correlates to fluctuations in CO2.

Cycads between 11.5 and 5 million years ago began to rediversify after previous declines in variety due to climatic changes, and thus modern cycads are not a good model for a "living fossil". Eucalyptus fossil leaves occur in the Miocene of New Zealand, where the genus is not native today, but have been introduced from Australia.

Fauna

Both marine and continental fauna were fairly modern, although marine mammals were less numerous. Only in isolated South America and Australia did widely divergent fauna exist.

In the Early Miocene, several Oligocene groups were still diverse, including nimravids, entelodonts, and three-toed equids. Like in the previous Oligocene Epoch, oreodonts were still diverse, only to disappear in the earliest Pliocene. During the later Miocene mammals were more modern, with easily recognizable canids, bears, red pandas, procyonids, equids, beavers, deer, camelids, and whales, along with now extinct groups like borophagine canids, certain gomphotheres, three-toed horses, and hornless rhinos like Teleoceras and Aphelops. Islands began to form between South and North America in the Late Miocene, allowing ground sloths like Thinobadistes to island-hop to North America. The expansion of silica-rich C4 grasses led to worldwide extinctions of herbivorous species without high-crowned teeth.

Mustelids diversified into their largest forms as terrestrial predators like Ekorus, Eomellivora, and Megalictis and bunodont otters like Enhydriodon and Sivaonyx appeared.

Unequivocally recognizable dabbling ducks, plovers, typical owls, cockatoos and crows appear during the Miocene. By the epoch's end, all or almost all modern bird groups are believed to have been present; the few post-Miocene bird fossils which cannot be placed in the evolutionary tree with full confidence are simply too badly preserved, rather than too equivocal in character. Marine birds reached their highest diversity ever in the course of this epoch.

The youngest representatives of Choristodera, an extinct order of aquatic reptiles that first appeared in the Middle Jurassic, are known from the Miocene of Europe, belonging to the genus Lazarussuchus, which had been the only known surviving genus of the group since the beginning of the Eocene.

The last known representatives of the archaic primitive mammal order Meridiolestida, which dominated South America during the Late Cretaceous, are known from the Miocene of Patagonia, represented by the mole-like Necrolestes.

The youngest known representatives of metatherians (marsupial relatives) in the Northern Hemisphere landmasses (Asia, North America and Europe) and Africa are known from the Miocene, including the North American herpetotheriid Herpetotherium, the European herpetotheriid Amphiperatherium, the peradectids Siamoperadectes and Sinoperadectes from Asia, and the possible herpetotheriid Morotodon from the late Early Miocene of Uganda.

Approximately 100 species of apes lived during this time, ranging throughout Africa, Asia and Europe and varying widely in size, diet, and anatomy. Due to scanty fossil evidence it is unclear which ape or apes contributed to the modern hominid clade, but molecular evidence indicates this ape lived between 18 and 13 million years ago. The first hominins (bipedal apes of the human lineage) appeared in Africa at the very end of the Miocene, including Sahelanthropus, Orrorin, and an early form of Ardipithecus (A. kadabba) The chimpanzee–human divergence is thought to have occurred at this time.

The expansion of grasslands in North America also led to an explosive radiation among snakes. Previously, snakes were a minor component of the North American fauna, but during the Miocene, the number of species and their prevalence increased dramatically with the first appearances of vipers and elapids in North America and the significant diversification of Colubridae (including the origin of many modern genera such as Nerodia, Lampropeltis, Pituophis and Pantherophis).

In the oceans, brown algae, called kelp, proliferated, supporting new species of sea life, including otters, fish and various invertebrates.

Cetaceans attained their greatest diversity during the Miocene, with over 20 recognized genera of baleen whales in comparison to only six living genera. This diversification correlates with emergence of gigantic macro-predators such as megatoothed sharks and raptorial sperm whales. Prominent examples are O. megalodon and L. melvillei. Other notable large sharks were O. chubutensis, Isurus hastalis, and Hemipristis serra.

Crocodilians also showed signs of diversification during Miocene. The largest form among them was a gigantic caiman Purussaurus which inhabited South America. Another gigantic form was a false gharial Rhamphosuchus, which inhabited modern age India. A strange form, Mourasuchus also thrived alongside Purussaurus. This species developed a specialized filter-feeding mechanism, and it likely preyed upon small fauna despite its gigantic size. The youngest members of Sebecidae, a clade of terrestrial crocodylfomes distantly related to modern crocodilians, are known from the Miocene of South America.

The last Desmostylians thrived during this period before becoming the only extinct marine mammal order.

The pinnipeds, which appeared near the end of the Oligocene, became more aquatic. A prominent genus was Allodesmus. A ferocious walrus, Pelagiarctos may have preyed upon other species of pinnipeds including Allodesmus.

Furthermore, South American waters witnessed the arrival of Megapiranha paranensis, which were considerably larger than modern age piranhas.

New Zealand's Miocene fossil record is particularly rich. Marine deposits showcase a variety of cetaceans and penguins, illustrating the evolution of both groups into modern representatives. The early Miocene Saint Bathans Fauna is the only Cenozoic terrestrial fossil record of the landmass, showcasing a wide variety of not only bird species, including early representatives of clades such as moas, kiwis and adzebills, but also a diverse herpetofauna of sphenodontians, crocodiles and turtle as well as a rich terrestrial mammal fauna composed of various species of bats and the enigmatic Saint Bathans Mammal.

Microbiota
Microbial life in the igneous crust of the Fennoscandian Shield shifted from being dominated by methanogens to being primarily composed of sulphate-reducing prokaryotes. The change resulted from fracture reactivation during the Pyrenean-Alpine orogeny, enabling sulphate-reducing microbes to permeate into the Fennoscandian Shield via descending surficial waters.

Oceans
There is evidence from oxygen isotopes at Deep Sea Drilling Program sites that ice began to build up in Antarctica about 36 Ma during the Eocene. Further marked decreases in temperature during the Middle Miocene at 15 Ma probably reflect increased ice growth in Antarctica. It can therefore be assumed that East Antarctica had some glaciers during the early to mid Miocene (23–15 Ma). Oceans cooled partly due to the formation of the Antarctic Circumpolar Current, and about 15 million years ago the ice cap in the southern hemisphere started to grow to its present form. The Greenland ice cap developed later, in the Middle Pliocene time, about 3 million years ago.

Middle Miocene disruption

The "Middle Miocene disruption" refers to a wave of extinctions of terrestrial and aquatic life forms that occurred following the Miocene Climatic Optimum (18 to 16 Ma), around 14.8 to 14.5 million years ago, during the Langhian Stage of the mid-Miocene. A major and permanent cooling step occurred between 14.8 and 14.1 Ma, associated with increased production of cold Antarctic deep waters and a major growth of the East Antarctic ice sheet. A Middle Miocene δ18O increase, that is, a relative increase in the heavier isotope of oxygen, has been noted in the Pacific, the Southern Ocean and the South Atlantic.

Impact event
A large impact event occurred either during the Miocene (23 Ma – 5.3 Ma) or the Pliocene (5.3 Ma – 2.6 Ma). The event formed the Karakul crater (52 km diameter), in Tajikistan which is estimated to have an age of less than 23 Ma or less than 5 Ma.

See also
 Geologic time scale
 List of fossil sites
 :Category:Miocene animals

References

Further reading
 Cox, C. Barry & Moore, Peter D. (1993): Biogeography. An ecological and evolutionary approach (5th ed.). Blackwell Scientific Publications, Cambridge. 
 Ogg, Jim (2004): "Overview of Global Boundary Stratotype Sections and Points (GSSP's)". Retrieved 2006-04-30.

External links

 PBS Deep Time: Miocene
 UCMP Berkeley Miocene Epoch Page
 Miocene Microfossils: 200+ images of Miocene Foraminifera
 Human Timeline (Interactive) – Smithsonian, National Museum of Natural History (August 2016).

 
Geological epochs
Neogene geochronology